This is list of breweries in South Dakota. South Dakota is one of 14 U.S. states that forbids small breweries from directly distributing beer products. Small breweries are required to use a distributor, per South Dakota law.

Breweries

Armour Brewing - Armour
Backspace Brewing - Yankton
Ben's Brewing - Yankton
Buffalo Ridge Brewing - Hartford
Choteau Creek Brew - Wagner
Cohort Craft Brewery - Rapid City
Covert Artisan Brewing - Sioux Falls
Crow Peak Brewing Company - Spearfish
Dakota Point Brewing - Rapid City
Dakota Shivers Brewing - Lead
Dempsey's Brewery, Pub, and Restaurant - Watertown
Eponymous Brewing Co. - Brookings
Fernson Brewing Company - Sioux Falls
Firehouse Brewing Company - Rapid City
Granite City Food & Brewery - Sioux Falls
Hay Camp Brewing Co. - Rapid City
A Homestead Brew - Valley Springs
Jacob's Brewhouse and Grocer - Deadwood
Jefferson Beer Supply - Jefferson
The Knuckle - Sturgis
Look's Beer Co. - Sioux Falls
Lost Cabin Beer Co. - Rapid City
Lupulin Brewing - Sioux Falls
Miner Brewing Company - Hill City
Mt Rushmore Brewing - Custer
Obscure Brewing - Sioux Falls
One Legged Pheasant - Aberdeen
Platte Creek Brewing Company- Geddes 
Piney 44 - Rapid City
Remedy Brewing Co. - Sioux Falls
Sawyer Brewing - Spearfish
Severance Brewing Company - Sioux Falls
Sick N Twisted Brewery - Hill City
Spearfish Brewing - Spearfish
Watertown Brewing - Watertown
Wooden Legs Brewing Co. - Brookings
WoodGrain Brewing Co. - Sioux Falls
Woodland Republic Brewing and Blending- Rapid City 
Zymurcracy Beer Company - Rapid City

Historical breweries
Black Hills Brewing Co.

Wineries
Baumberger Vineyard and Winery - Dell Rapids
Birdsong Vineyard - Beresford
Calico Skies Vineyard & Winery - Inwood, Iowa (near SD border)
Chateau Sylvania Vineyard and Winery - Toronto
ChrisaMari Winery - Pierre
Dakota Falls Winery - Brandon
Firehouse Wine Cellars - Rapid City 
Naked Winery - Custer 
Prairie Berry Winery - Hill City 
Schade' Vineyard and Winery - Volga
Schade' Winery - Deadwood
Strawbale Winery - Renner
Tucker's Walk Vineyard - Garretson
Valiant Vineyards Winery - Vermillion

See also 
 Beer in the United States
 List of breweries in the United States
 List of microbreweries
South Dakota wine

References

Further reading
Stewart, Kenneth (2012). "'Dakota's Finest': A Sampler of Early South Dakota Brewing History". South Dakota History Vol. 42, No. 4 Winter 2012. South Dakota State Historical Society Press.

Companies based in South Dakota
South Dakota
South Dakota

Breweries
South Dakota